"Daydreamer" is a song by the American singer David Cassidy.

Written by Terry Dempsey and produced by Rick Jarrard, "Daydreamer" was Cassidy's  second and final No.1 single in the UK Singles Chart, spending three weeks at the top of the chart in October and November 1973. The song was a double-A side with a cover version of Harry Nilsson's "The Puppy Song" on the B-side. The single was the 10th best selling single in the UK in 1973.

The song also appears on David Cassidy's 1973 UK No.1 album Dreams Are Nuthin' More Than Wishes.

Cilla Black recorded a version of this song in 1974. The French singer Claude François also recorded a version of this song called "Le mal aimé" which was a hit in France and Belgium. Singers of musical Belles belles belles covered the Claude François' song.

The song's only chart appearances in the US were by C.C. & Company and Gino Cunico in 1976. C.C. & Company’s soul-flavored version (produced by Mike Theodore and Dennis Coffey) entered the Hot 100 on January 3, 1976, and made it to #91 six weeks later. Cunico’s cover, on Arista Records, which hit No. 43 on the Billboard Easy Listening Chart, added a bridge repeating the phrase "ain't that a shame", echoing the lyrical variation introduced by Cilla Black in her 1974 treatment of the song.

Chart history

Weekly charts

David Cassidy

Year-end charts

C.C. & Company

Gino Cunico

References

1973 songs
1973 singles
1975 singles
1976 singles
UK Singles Chart number-one singles
David Cassidy songs
Song recordings produced by Rick Jarrard
Bell Records singles
Arista Records singles